The 2013–14 GlobalPort Batang Pier season was the second season of the franchise in the Philippine Basketball Association (PBA).

Key dates
November 3: The 2013 PBA Draft took place in Midtown Atrium, Robinson Place Manila.
November 9:  Junel Baculi is replaced by Richie Ticzon as head coach of the GlobalPort Batang Pier.
January 29: Richie Ticzon is replaced by Pido Jarencio as head coach.

Draft picks

Roster

Philippine Cup

Eliminations

Standings

Commissioner's Cup

Eliminations

Standings

Governors' Cup

Eliminations

Standings

Transactions

Trades

Pre-season

Recruited imports

References

NorthPort Batang Pier seasons
GlobalPort